National Route 505 is a national highway of Japan. The highway connects Motobu, Okinawa and Nago, Okinawa.

References

505
Roads in Okinawa Prefecture